Gartnavel General Hospital is a teaching hospital in the West End of Glasgow, Scotland. The hospital is located next to the Great Western Road, between Hyndland, Anniesland and Kelvindale. Hyndland railway station is adjacent to the hospital. The name Gartnavel is derived from the Gaelic Gart (field or enclosure) Ubhal (apple) – i.e. "a field of apple trees". It is managed by NHS Greater Glasgow and Clyde.

History
In April 1965, the Western Regional Hospital Board announced a major building programme and the following year a £1 million contract was awarded for a new district general hospital to be sited beside the existing Gartnavel Royal Hospital. The hospital was designed by Keppie, Henderson & Partners in association with Thomas Astorga, It was initially used to house units from the Western Infirmary that were relocating while the hospital buildings were being demolished and replaced. The hospital was officially opened by Princess Alexandra in October 1973.

Originally a single eight-storey block containing 576 beds standing on a three-storey podium, further buildings have since been added, with the most recent being a new cancer care centre in 2007 to replace the Beatson Oncology Centre facilities that were spread between Gartnavel, the Western Infirmary and the Royal Infirmary.

Brownlee Centre 
The Brownlee Centre for Infectious and Communicable Diseases opened on the Gartnavel General Hospital site in 1998, replacing services and research laboratories at the city's Ruchill Hospital. It is one of four laboratories in the UK on the WHO list of laboratories able to perform PCR for rapid diagnosis of influenza A (H1N1) virus infection in humans.

The Brownlee Centre was designated as the receiving centre for any potential Ebola virus disease cases during the 2014 Commonwealth Games.

On 29 December 2014, Pauline Cafferkey, a British aid worker who had just returned from Sierra Leone was diagnosed with Ebola virus disease at the centre. On 30 December 2014, she was transferred to the specialist Ebola treatment centre at the Royal Free Hospital in London for longer-term treatment.

References

External links 

 
 Gartnavel General Hospital on the NHS inform website
 Healthcare Improvement Scotland inspection reports

Hospital buildings completed in 1972
Hospitals in Glasgow
NHS Scotland hospitals
Teaching hospitals in Scotland
1972 establishments in Scotland
Hospitals established in 1972
University of Glasgow
Health facilities that treated Ebola patients
NHS Greater Glasgow and Clyde